Apollo LTD is a pop-rock duo from Nashville, Tennessee consisting of Jordan Phillips and Adam Stark. The band is signed to Residence Music, an imprint of Centricity Music.

History 

The two met in 2004 when they were paired as roommates at Nashville's Belmont University. They began writing and playing music while juggling assorted jobs including landscaping, swim coaching, and substitute teaching in the inner city school system. Apollo LTD's name was originally inspired by NASA. Phillips' uncle was an astronaut in the '90s which led to a fascination that still exists to this day. The Apollo program was birthed out of a desire to do something the United States had never done before as a country. When they started the band, the duo wanted to make music that they hadn't ever made prior. "It was our version of going to the moon in a tin can", Phillips explained.

Apollo LTD released their independent self-titled EP in 2015. It garnered critical acclaim from the likes of Consequence of Sound and The Atlantic and has received sync placements on Comedy Central, ESPN, FOX Sports, NBC, ABC, and more.

In August 2017, the band signed with Residence Music and released their first single "One in a Million". The track was later included on their 2018 Out of Body EP. Following the release of the EP, Apollo LTD released several additional singles in 2018 including "Gold", "One in a Million (DENM Remix)", and "On the Way Up". The band released their singles "Heaven (All Around You)" and "DNA" in early 2019.

The first single “One In A Million” merges sweeping synths, arena-ready guitars, and a hypnotic hook evocative of Achtung Baby-era U2 with a clever catchiness. “Big concerts have always captivated us. That is the starting point in anything we create; that energy is addicting and what we are drawn to as well as the great artists of our time who had something to say. The likes of Bob Dylan, Marilyn Manson, and U2. We are influenced by everything. We have a hard drive of 36,000 gigs of various sounds to play around with when recording,” says Adam.

In the end, Apollo LTD continually fulfill a shared dream to venture into new musical territory on the latest EP, and they do so by connecting with each and every song.

“We want people to understand that we’re all experiencing many of the same things,” Jordan leaves off. “Art and creation come from a place of introspection and self-awareness, but also a desire to serve. We want to create art to connect with people—to bring them together. A song can make you feel as if you belong. We know that feeling so well. Transcendent art creates empathy and inclusion. We’re all trying to figure out this ‘being human’thing. We all wrestle with doubt and darkness, but there is joy to be found in our circumstances and immeasurable beauty that surrounds us every day.”

It’s clear that this duo is on a mission to not only create music that is expansive, otherworldly and energetic but to also send a message that we are not alone.

Band members 

Current members
 Jordan Phillips
 Adam Stark

Discography 

Albums
 Out of Body (2019)
 Nothing is ordinary, Everything is Beautiful (2021)

Extended plays
 Apollo LTD (2015)
 Out of Body (2018)

Singles

References

External links 

Musical groups from Tennessee
2004 establishments in Tennessee
Musical groups established in 2004